Nikoloz Shengelaia (Obudzhi, Tsalenjikha District  – Tbilisi, 4 January 1943) was a Soviet Georgian film director.

Nikoloz Shengelaia was one of the founders of Georgian cinema. His epic 1928 silent film “Eliso” is about the exile of Circassian and Chechen people and the colonization of their land in the Caucasus Mountains by imperial Russia. The film has a broad range of themes such as betrayal, social injustice, and resilience in the face of adversity. The film's protagonist is a passionate and brave young woman. Nikoloz Shengelaia put Georgian cinema on the map with “Eliso.”

Nikoloz Shengelaia was married to the movie star, Nato Vachnadze, and their sons Giorgi Shengelaia and Eldar Shengelaia continued the family legacy by becoming prominent film directors in their own right, leaving their own indelible mark on Georgian cinema.

Selected filmography
Giuli (1927)
Eliso (1928)
Twenty-Six Commissars (1932)
The Golden Valley (1937)
Motherland (1939)
In the Black Mountains (1941)
He Would Come Back (1943)

References

External links

Nikoloz Shengelaia at the Georgian Cinema Database 
Photogalery on burusi.com

1903 births
1943 deaths
People from Samegrelo-Zemo Svaneti
Mingrelians
Film directors from Georgia (country)
Soviet film directors
Stalin Prize winners